Kennedy Baptist College is an Australian coeducational, independent, Baptist, secondary school located in Murdoch, Western Australia. The school educated 1124 pupils in 2019, and is named after Baptist minister and pioneer William Kennedy. It is situated on the grounds of  Murdoch University.

Overview
Kennedy Baptist College is headed by a board that appoints the headmaster. The current headmaster, Mark Ashby, was appointed for the opening of the school in 2013. He was the foundation principal of Mandurah Baptist College in 2005.

History
Kennedy Baptist College was established in 2013 following the amalgamation of two neighbouring schools, Winthrop Baptist College and Somerville Baptist College, founded in 1994 and 1999 respectively.

The name of the school was chosen to honour the legacy of William Kennedy, a pastor and pioneer in the Baptist Union movement within Western Australia.

In March 2017, the school opened a new $3.6 million sport centre. The school received financial support for the project from the Capital Grants Program and a low interest loan from the Government of Western Australia. The sporting complex is able to be configured to suit multiple basketball, netball, volleyball or badminton courts. It also includes a fitness gymnasium and change and shower facilities.

In October 2020, the school opened a new state of the art technologies centre. It includes a STEM Studio, Computer Graphics and Design (CAD) Studio and a Wood and Metal Fabrication Workshop. The project was jointly funded by the Western Australian Government under the low interest loan scheme and Kennedy Baptist College. The project was the final stage of the school's master plan which began in 2013.

The College Board has ratified the Master Plan - 2021 and the future which will include the redevelopment of the Auditorium, the building of additional classes and offices and the development of a 250-seat lecture theatre.

Academic ranking

Notable alumni 

 Sam Kerr, soccer player (Somerville Baptist College)

References

External links 

Private secondary schools in Perth, Western Australia
Baptist schools in Australia
Murdoch, Western Australia
2013 establishments in Australia
Educational institutions established in 2013